Amina Hanim (1770 – 1824) was the first princess consort of Muhammad Ali of Egypt, the first monarch of the Muhammad Ali dynasty.

Early life
Amina Hanim was born in 1770 at Nusratli, Rumeli Eyalet. She was the daughter of Nusretli Ali Agha, the governor of Kavala, and relative of the Chorbashi. She had two brothers, Mustafa Pasha, and Ali Pasha, and three sisters, Maryam Hanim, Pakiza Hanim, and Ifat Hanim.

First marriage
Amina Hanim had been earlier married to Ali Bey. However, the marriage was not consummated because her husband had died before the pair had cohabited.

Second marriage
Amina Hanim married Muhammad Ali Pasha in 1787, long before he became the Viceroy of Egypt, and rising to the rank of Pasha. She gave birth to four sons who survived to adulthood, Ibrahim Pasha of Egypt, Ahmad Tusun Pasha, Isma'il Kamil Pasha, Abd al-Halim Bey, and two daughters, Tawhida Hanim, and Khadija Nazli Hanim. Muhammad Ali had a fondness for her, and treated her with respect.

Amina Hanim did not accompany Muhammd Ali to Egypt, and after his appointment as viceroy in 1805, she and her daughters resided for a period of some two years in Istanbul, where they became thoroughly acquainted with imperial palace culture. Upon her arrival and installation in the harem of the Citadel Palace in Cairo in 1808, Amina Hanim became estranged from Muhammad Ali due to the many slave concubines he had acquired.

In 1814 Amina Hanim made a pilgrimage, processing from Jeddah to Mecca with a train of 500 camels carrying her servants, entourage and goods. She was met by Muhammad Ali at Mina, a stage in the pilgrimage, in a public acknowledgment of her status as first consort. Due to the grandeur of her train and guard, and the sumptuous of her tent, the local inhabitants are said to have called her "the Queen of the Nile."

When her son Tusun Pasha died of plague at the age of twenty three in 1816, Amina Hanim took his wife, Bamba Qadin, and her son Abbas, to live with her, and refused to be parted from him.

Death
Amina Hanim died in 1824, and was buried at Hosh al-Basha, the mausoleum of Imam-i Shafi'i in Cairo.

See also
Muhammad Ali Dynasty family tree

References

Sources

Year of birth unknown
1824 deaths
Burials in Egypt
Muhammad Ali dynasty
Egyptian princesses
19th-century Egyptian women